Identity management (IdM), also known as identity and access management (IAM or IdAM), is a framework of policies and technologies to ensure that the right users (that are part of the ecosystem connected to or within an enterprise) have the appropriate access to technology resources. IdM systems fall under the overarching umbrellas of IT security and data management. Identity and access management systems not only identify, authenticate, and control access for individuals who will be utilizing IT resources but also the hardware and applications employees need to access.

IdM addresses the need to ensure appropriate access to resources across increasingly heterogeneous technology environments and to meet increasingly rigorous compliance requirements.

The terms "identity management" (IdM) and "identity and access management" are used interchangeably in the area of identity access management.

Identity-management systems, products, applications and platforms manage identifying and ancillary data about entities that include individuals, computer-related hardware, and software applications.

IdM covers issues such as how users gain an identity, the roles, and sometimes the permissions that identity grants, the protection of that identity, and the technologies supporting that protection (e.g., network protocols, digital certificates, passwords, etc.).

Definitions 
Identity management (ID management) – or identity and access management (IAM) – is the organizational and technical processes for first registering and authorizing access rights in the configuration phase, and then in the operation phase for identifying, authenticating and controlling individuals or groups of people to have access to applications, systems or networks based on previously authorized access rights. Identity management (IdM) is the task of controlling information about users on computers. Such information includes information that authenticates the identity of a user, and information that describes data and actions they are authorized to access and/or perform. It also includes the management of descriptive information about the user and how and by whom that information can be accessed and modified. In addition to users, managed entities typically include hardware and network resources and even applications. The diagram below shows the relationship between the configuration and operation phases of IAM, as well as the distinction between identity management and access management.

Access control is the enforcement of access rights defined as part of access authorization.

Digital identity is an entity's online presence, encompassing personal identifying information (PII) and ancillary information. See OECD and NIST guidelines on protecting PII. It can be interpreted as the codification of identity names and attributes of a physical instance in a way that facilitates processing.

Function 
In the real-world context of engineering online systems, identity management can involve five basic functions:

 The pure identity function: Creation, management and deletion of identities without regard to access or entitlements;
 The user access (log-on) function: For example: a smart card and its associated data used by a customer to log on to a service or services (a traditional view);
 The service function: A system that delivers personalized, role-based, online, on-demand, multimedia (content), presence-based services to users and their devices.
 Identity Federation: A system that relies on federated identity to authenticate a user without knowing their password.
 Audit function: Monitor bottlenecks, malfunctions and suspect behaviour.

Pure identity 
A general model of identity can be constructed from a small set of axioms, for example that all identities in a given namespace are unique, or that such identities bear a specific relationship to corresponding entities in the real world. Such an axiomatic model expresses "pure identity" in the sense that the model is not constrained by a specific application context.

In general, an entity (real or virtual) can have multiple identities and each identity can encompass multiple attributes, some of which are unique within a given name space. The diagram below illustrates the conceptual relationship between identities and entities, as well as between identities and their attributes.

In most theoretical and all practical models of digital identity, a given identity object consists of a finite set of properties (attribute values). These properties record information about the object, either for purposes external to the model or to operate the model, for example in classification and retrieval. A "pure identity" model is strictly not concerned with the external semantics of these properties.

The most common departure from "pure identity" in practice occurs with properties intended to assure some aspect of identity, for example a digital signature or software token which the model may use internally to verify some aspect of the identity in satisfaction of an external purpose. To the extent that the model expresses such semantics internally, it is not a pure model.

Contrast this situation with properties that might be externally used for purposes of information security such as managing access or entitlement, but which are simply stored, maintained and retrieved, without special treatment by the model. The absence of external semantics within the model qualifies it as a "pure identity" model.

Identity management can thus be defined as a set of operations on a given identity model, or more generally, as a set of capabilities with reference to it.

In practice, identity management often expands to express how model content is to be provisioned and reconciled among multiple identity models.

User access 
User access enables users to assume a specific digital identity across applications, which enables access controls to be assigned and evaluated against this identity. The use of a single identity for a given user across multiple systems eases tasks for administrators and users. It simplifies access monitoring and verification and allows the organizations to minimize excessive privileges granted to one user. User access can be tracked from initiation to termination of user access.

When organizations deploy an identity management process or system, their motivation is normally not primarily to manage a set of identities, but rather to grant appropriate access rights to those entities via their identities. In other words, access management is normally the motivation for identity management and the two sets of processes are consequently closely related.

Services 
Organizations continue to add services for both internal users and by customers. Many such services require identity management to properly provide these services. Increasingly, identity management has been partitioned from application functions so that a single identity can serve many or even all of an organization's activities.

For internal use identity management is evolving to control access to all digital assets, including devices, network equipment, servers, portals, content, applications and/or products.

Services often require access to extensive information about a user, including address books, preferences, entitlements and contact information. Since much of this information is subject to privacy and/or confidentiality requirements, controlling access to it is vital.

Identity federation 

Identity federation comprises one or more systems that share user access and allow users to log in based on authenticating against one of the systems participating in the federation. This trust between several systems is often known as "Circle of Trust". In this setup, one system acts as the Identity Provider (IdP) and other system(s) acts as Service Provider (SP). When a user needs to access some service controlled by SP, they first authenticate against the IdP. Upon successful authentication, the IdP sends a secure "assertion" to the Service Provider. "SAML assertions, specified using a markup language intended for describing security assertions, can be used by a verifier to make a statement to a relying party about the identity of a claimant. SAML assertions may optionally be digitally signed."

System capabilities 
In addition to creation, deletion, modification of user identity data either assisted or self-service, identity management controls ancillary entity data for use by applications, such as contact information or location.
 Authentication: Verification that an entity is who/what it claims to be using a password, biometrics such as a fingerprint, or distinctive behavior such as a gesture pattern on a touchscreen.
 Authorization: Managing authorization information that defines what operations an entity can perform in the context of a specific application. For example, one user might be authorized to enter a sales order, while a different user is authorized to approve the credit request for that order.
 Roles: Roles are groups of operations and/or other roles. Users are granted roles often related to a particular job or job function. Roles are granted authorizations, effectively authorizing all users which have been granted the role. For example, a user administrator role might be authorized to reset a user's password, while a system administrator role might have the ability to assign a user to a specific server.
 Delegation: Delegation allows local administrators or supervisors to perform system modifications without a global administrator or for one user to allow another to perform actions on their behalf. For example, a user could delegate the right to manage office-related information.
 Interchange: The SAML protocol is a prominent means used to exchange identity information between two identity domains. OpenID Connect is another such protocol.

Privacy 
Putting personal information onto computer networks necessarily raises privacy concerns. Absent proper protections, the data may be used to implement a surveillance society.

Social web and online social networking services make heavy use of identity management. Helping users decide how to manage access to their personal information has become an issue of broad concern.

Identity theft 
Identity theft happens when thieves gain access to identity information – such as the personal details needed to get access to a bank account.

Research 
Research related to the management of identity covers disciplines such as technology, social sciences, humanities and the law.

Decentralized identity management is identity management based on decentralized identifiers (DIDs).

European research 
Within the Seventh Research Framework Programme of the European Union from 2007 to 2013, several new projects related to Identity Management started.

The PICOS Project investigates and develops a state-of-the-art platform for providing trust, privacy and identity management in mobile communities.

PrimeLife develops concepts and technologies to help individuals to protect autonomy and retain control over personal information, irrespective of activities.

SWIFT focuses on extending identity functions and federation to the network while addressing usability and privacy concerns and leverages identity technology as a key to integrate service and transport infrastructures for the benefit of users and the providers.

Ongoing projects 
Ongoing projects include Future of Identity in the Information Society (FIDIS), GUIDE, and PRIME.

Publications 
Academic journals that publish articles related to identity management include:
 Ethics and Information Technology
 Identity in the Information Society
 Surveillance & Society

Less specialized journals publish on the topic and for instance have special issues on Identity such as:
 Online Information Review.

Standardization 
ISO (and more specifically ISO/IEC JTC 1, SC27 IT Security techniques WG5 Identity Access Management and Privacy techniques) is conducting some standardization work for identity management , such as the elaboration of a framework for identity management, including the definition of identity-related terms. The published standards and current work items includes the following:
 ISO/IEC 24760-1 A framework for identity management  Part 1: Terminology and concepts
 ISO/IEC 24760-2 A Framework for Identity Management  Part 2: Reference architecture and requirements
 ISO/IEC DIS 24760-3 A Framework for Identity Management  Part 3: Practice
 ISO/IEC 29115 Entity Authentication Assurance
 ISO/IEC 29146 A framework for access management
 ISO/IEC CD 29003 Identity Proofing and Verification
 ISO/IEC 29100 Privacy framework
 ISO/IEC 29101 Privacy Architecture
 ISO/IEC 29134 Privacy Impact Assessment Methodology

Organization implications 
In each organization there is normally a role or department that is responsible for managing the schema of digital identities of their staff and their own objects, which are represented by object identities or object identifiers (OID).
The organizational policies and processes and procedures related to the oversight of identity management are sometimes referred to as Identity Governance and Administration (IGA). Commercial software tools exist to help automate and simplify such organisational-level identity management functions. How effectively and appropriately such tools are used falls within scope of broader governance, risk management, and compliance regimes.

Since 2016 Identity and Access Management professionals have their own professional organization, IDPro. In 2018 the committee initiated the publication of An Annotated Bibliography, listing a number of important publications, books, presentations and videos.

Management systems
An identity-management system refers to an information system, or to a set of technologies that can be used for enterprise or cross-network identity management.

Additional terms are used synonymously with "identity-management system" include:
 Access-governance system
 Identity and access management system
 Entitlement-management system
User provisioning system

Identity management, otherwise known as identity and access management (IAM) is an identity security framework that works to authenticate and authorize user access to resources such as applications, data, systems, and cloud platforms. It seeks to ensure only the right people are being provisioned to the right tools, and for the right reasons. As our digital ecosystem continues to advance, so does the world of identity management.

"Identity management" and "access and identity management" (or AIM) are terms that are used interchangeably under the title of identity management while identity management itself falls under the umbrella of IT security and information privacy and privacy risk as well as usability and e-inclusion studies.

There are three components of Identity and Access Management (IAM):
 Access management/Single sign-on to verify users' identities before they can access the network and applications
 Identity governance to ensure that user access is being granted according to appropriate access policies for onboarding and role/responsibility changes
 Privileged access management to control and monitor access to highly privileged accounts, applications and system assets

These technologies can be combined using identity governance, which provides the foundation for automated workflows and processes.

Modes of identity management 
Identity is conceptualized in three different modes, according to an analysis:from the FIDIS Network of Excellence:

 Idem-identity: A third-person (i.e., objectified) attribution of sameness. Such an objectified perspective can not only be taken towards others but also towards oneself.
 Ipse-identity: The ipse-identity perspective is the first-person perspective on what constitutes oneself as a continuous being (idem) in the course of time, while experiencing multiplicity and difference in the here and now.
 me-identity: The 'me' (G. H. Mead) is the organised set of attitudes of others which one assumes. It is coconstituted by the 'I', the first person perspective, which incorporates the variety of third person perspectives it encounters and develops. Thus, the 'me' is continuously reconstituted in the face of changing third person perspectives on the self.

In Bertino's and Takahashi's textbook, three categories of identity are defined that are to a degree overlapping with the FIDIS identity concepts:

 ”Me-Identity": What I define as identity
 ”Our-Identity": What others and I define as identity
 ”Their-Identity": What others define as my identity

Purposes for using identity management systems 
Identity management systems are concerned with the creation, the administration and the deployment of:

 Identifiers: Data used to identify a subject.
 Credentials: Data providing evidence for claims about identities or parts thereof.
 Attributes: Data describing characteristics of a subject.

The purposes of identity management systems are:

 Identification: Who is the user – used on logon or database lookup
 Authentication: Is this the real user? Systems needs to provide evidence!
 Authorization and non-repudiation: Authorization of documents or transaction with e-ID and most often with digital signature based on e-ID. Generates non-repudiation and receipts.

Commercial solutions 
Identity-management systems, products, applications, and platforms are commercial Identity-management solutions implemented for enterprises and organizations.
 
Technologies, services, and terms related to identity management include Microsoft Windows active directory, service providers, identity providers, Web services, access control, digital identities, password managers, single sign-on, security tokens, security token services (STS), workflows, OpenID, WS-Security, WS-Trust, SAML 2.0, OAuth, and RBAC.

Electronic identity management 

In general, electronic IdM can be said to cover the management of any form of digital identities.  
The focus on identity management goes back to the development of directories, such as X.500, where a namespace serves to hold named objects that represent real-life "identified" entities, such as countries, organizations, applications, subscribers or devices. The X.509 ITU-T standard defined certificates carried identity attributes as two directory names: the certificate subject and the certificate issuer. X.509 certificates and PKI systems operate to prove the online "identity" of a subject. Therefore, in IT terms, one can consider identity management as the management of information (as held in a directory) that represents items identified in real life (e.g. users, organizations, devices, services, etc.). The design of such systems requires explicit information and identity engineering tasks.

The evolution of identity management follows the progression of Internet technology closely. In the environment of static web pages and static portals of the early 1990s, corporations investigated the delivery of informative web content such as the "white pages" of employees. Subsequently, as the information changed (due to employee turnover, provisioning and de-provisioning), the ability to perform self-service and help-desk updates more efficiently morphed into what became known as Identity Management .

Solutions 

Solutions which fall under the category of identity management may include:

Management of identities
 Provisioning and deprovisioning of accounts
 Workflow automation
 Delegated administration
 Password synchronization
 Self-service password reset

Access control
 Password manager
 Single sign-on (SSO)
 Web single sign-on (Web SSO)
 Role-based access control (RBAC)
 Attribute based access control (ABAC)

Directory services
 x.500 and LDAP
 Microsoft Active Directory
 Microsoft Azure Active Directory
 NetIQ eDirectory
 Identity repository (directory services for the administration of user account attributes)
 Metadata replication and synchronization
 Directory virtualization (Virtual directory)
 e-Business scale directory systems
 Next-generation systems – Composite Adaptive Directory Services (CADS) and CADS SDP

Other categories
 Federation of user access rights on web applications across otherwise untrusted networks
 Directory-enabled networking and 802.1X EAP

Standards 
 SAML 2.0
 OAuth
 OpenID
 Liberty Alliance – A consortium promoting federated identity management
 Shibboleth (Internet2) – Identity standards targeted towards educational environments
 Global Trust Center
 Central Authentication Service
 NIST SP 800-63

See also

References

Sources

External links 
 General Public Tutorial about Privacy and Identity Management
 Identity Management Overview (Computer Weekly)
 Secure Widespread Identities for Federated Telecommunications (SWIFT)
 Identity management and information sharing in ISO 18876 Industrial automation systems and integration
 50 Data Principles for Loosely-Coupled Identity Management: SlideShare
 Stop Remembering Password and Switch to Identity Management: Business Insider
 NIST SP 800-63

 
Computer security procedures
Management cybernetics